Minuscule 517 (in the Gregory-Aland numbering), ε 167 α 214 (in the Soden numbering), is a Greek minuscule manuscript of the New Testament on parchment. It has been palaeographically dated to the 11th or 12th century. 
Scrivener labeled it by number 503. The manuscript is lacunose. It was adapted for liturgical use.

Description 

The codex contains the text of the New Testament on 201 parchment leaves (size ) with major lacunae (Acts 1:1-17:24; 18:13-28:31; 1 John 3:9-4:9; Hebrews 7:26-9:28; Luke 2:15-46; 6:42-24:53; entire Gospel of John), and originally would've contained the entire New Testament. Some lacunae were supplied by a later hand. It is written one column per page, 29-31 lines per page.

The Gospel Text is also divided according to the smaller Ammonian Sections (in Mark 234 Sections - the last section in 16:9), but has no references to the Eusebian Canons.

It has an unusual order of books: Acts, Catholic Epistles, Apocalypse, Pauline Epistles, and Gospels.

The manuscript has 10 cases of homoeoteleuton, 196 cases of movable nu (often with nouns), and 106 itacisms.

Text 

The Greek text of the codex is a mixture of the text-types. Aland did not place it in any category.

According to the Claremont Profile Method, it represents textual cluster 1675 in Luke 1 as a core member. In Luke 10 and Luke 20 manuscript is defective.

History 

In 1727 the manuscript came from Constantinople to England, and was presented to archbishop of Canterbury, William Wake, together with minuscules 73, 74, and 506-520. Wake presented it to Christ Church College in Oxford.

The manuscript was collated by F. H. A. Scrivener, and was added by him to the list of New Testament minuscule manuscripts (503). C. R. Gregory gave it the number 517.

Herman C. Hoskier collated the text of the Apocalypse.

It is currently housed at Christ Church (Wake 34) in Oxford.

See also 

 List of New Testament minuscules
 Biblical manuscript
 Textual criticism

References

Further reading 

 F. H. A. Scrivener, Adversaria critica sacra (Cambridge, 1893), pp. XXXVI–XXXVII. (as f)
 Herman C. Hoskier, Concerning the Text of the Apocalypse (London 1929), vol. 1, p. 55 (only of Revelation)

External links 

 Minuscule 517 at the Encyclopedia of Textual Criticism

Greek New Testament minuscules
11th-century biblical manuscripts